Nehi or NEHI may refer to:

 Nehi, a flavored soft drink
 NEHI, formerly known as the New England Healthcare Institute
 Nehi (Viceroy of Kush) or Nehy, an Ancient Egyptian official with the titles of a viceroy of Kush
 Neuroendocrine hyperplasia of infancy, a lung disease found in children
 The Nanotechnology Environmental and Health Implications working group, a body within the National Nanotechnology Initiative